Oliver Ellsworth Daggett (January 14, 1810 – August 31, 1880) was an American minister.

Daggett, son of the Hon. David Daggett, Chief Justice of the Supreme Court of Connecticut and Kent Professor of Law in Yale College, and of Wealthy Ann, daughter of Dr. Aeneas Munson, first Professor
of Materia Medica at the Yale Medical School, was born in New Haven, January 14, 1810.

Daggett graduated from Yale in 1828.  He spent three years in the Yale Law School; and was admitted to the bar in March, 1831. Subsequently, as a convert in the great religious revival of 1831, he determined to enter the Christian ministry, and spent nearly two years in the Yale Divinity School.  He was ordained pastor of the South Church in Hartford, Connecticut, April 12, 1837, and resigned that charge, June 23, 1843.  He was installed January 30, 1845, over the First Congregational Church in Canandaigua, New York, and was dismissed, October 16, 1867, to accept the pastorate of the church in Yale College, with the title of professor of divinity. He resigned this charge after three years of service, and was installed, February 21, 1871, over the Second Congregational Church in New London, Conn.

He retired from the arduous labors of a settled ministry with his dismission from this charge, September 5, 1877, and removed his residence to Hartford, Connecticut, where he died, without previous warning, of rupture of the heart, August 31, 1880, in his 71st year.

He received the degree of Doctor of Divinity from Hamilton College in 1853. He left no published memorials of his fine powers as a writer and his discriminating literary taste, except a few sermons, and articles in various periodicals. Since his death a small volume of his poems has been printed. From 1872 he was a member of the Corporation of Yale College.

He was married, July 15, 1840, to Elizabeth, daughter of William Watson, of Hartford. She survived him with two daughters and a son, the son being a graduate of the Sheffield Scientific School in 1864.

External links
 

 Dagget papers at Yale University

1810 births
1880 deaths
Religious leaders from New Haven, Connecticut
Yale Law School alumni
Yale Divinity School alumni
American Congregationalist ministers
American male writers
Lawyers from New Haven, Connecticut
Writers from New Haven, Connecticut
Yale College alumni
19th-century American lawyers
19th-century American clergy